Yongshun Town is a township-level division situated in Tongzhou District, Beijing. It borders Jinzhan Township and Songzhuang Town to its north, Luyi and Xinhua Subdistricts to its east, Beiyuan Subdistrict to its south, Guanzhuang and Changying Townships to its west, and has an exclave south of Luyuan Subdistrict. As of 2020, it had a population of 304,781 under its administration.

The town gets its name from Yongshun Village that preceded it.

History

Administrative divisions 
At the end of 2021, Yongshun Town was made up of 34 subdivisions, consisted of 13 communities and 21 villages:

Economics 
In 2018, the town's total tax revenue was 3.663 billion yuan, and the average personal income was 39.5 thousand yuan, approximately 10% increase from last year.

Gallery

See also
List of township-level divisions of Beijing

References

Towns in Beijing
Tongzhou District, Beijing